Hello Mister Zamindar is a 1965 Indian Tamil-language romantic comedy film, directed and produced by K. J. Mahadevan under the banner of Sudharsanam Pictures. The film dialogue was written by Ve. Lakshmanan and the story was written by Mahadevan respectively. Music was by Viswanathan–Ramamoorthy. It stars Gemini Ganesan and Savitri. The film was released on 14 May 1965.

Plot

Cast 

 Actors
 Gemini Ganesan as Sekar
 M. R. Radha as Azhagirisamy
 T. S. Balaiah as Zamin secretary
 V. Gopalakrishnan
 T. S. Muthaiah
 S. Rama Rao
 Ganapathi Bhutt
 Dakshinamurthi
 K. Natarajan
 A. Veerappan
 Murugan
 Das
 Velayudham
 G. G. Sharma
 Natarajan

 Actresses
 Savitri as Radha/Sarasu
 K. R. Indira Devi as Chellaye
 K. S. Angamuthu
 Seethalakshmi
 Ramani
 Mallika
 Radhabhai
 Madhuri
 Omana
 Kumari Saroja
 Gomathi
 Rajamma

Soundtrack 
Music was by Viswanathan–Ramamoorthy and lyrics were written by Kannadasan. The title song was later played in the film Jackson Durai (2016).

Reception 
Kalki appreciated Lakshmanan's dialogues, Kannadasan's lyrics and Mahadevan's direction.

References

External links 
 

1960s Tamil-language films
1965 films
1965 romantic comedy films
Films scored by Viswanathan–Ramamoorthy
Films set in Chennai
Indian black-and-white films
Indian romantic comedy films